The Pakistan Mint is a Pakistani coin press located in Shalimar Town, Lahore, Pakistan. It is the oldest mint located in Pakistan. It is governed by the State Bank of Pakistan.

The mint has been in operation since 1942. Currency denominations of 1, 2, 5 and are currently minted there. Previously 10 rupee coin was also minted here.

Pakistan Mint has residential quarters, shops and recreational parks located within the vicinity. It is located opposite of Mapco Corp. on Grand Trunk Road. Pakistan Mint has been manufacturing not only coins or currency for the state but also medals and awards for the Military Armed Forces, postal seals and stamps.

In 2010, the Pakistani government began plans to modernize and upgrade the mint. Plans include replacing obsolete machinery to increase productivity, quality and output-effectiveness. Plans also include boosting qualifications and expertise of the mint's employees.

References

Mints (currency)
State Bank of Pakistan
1942 establishments in British India
Government agencies established in 1942